The Essential Stabbing Westward is the first compilation album by the American industrial rock band Stabbing Westward, released on Sony Music as part of their Essential series. The album was released on April 1, 2003, a year after the band broke up on February 9, 2002. It features fourteen remastered tracks: twelve tracks from their three albums released in the 1990s (Ungod (1994), Wither Blister Burn & Peel (1996), and Darkest Days (1998)), and two from movie soundtracks.

Track listing

 A longer version of "Dawn" first appeared on the Japanese release of Wither Blister Burn & Peel.

References

Stabbing Westward albums
2003 greatest hits albums